The Prva B Liga, also known as Second Montenegrin League, is the second-tier of domestic basketball league system in Montenegro. The competition was founded in 2006.

History and format
During its first season, Prva B Liga (which means First B League) was organized through two groups. But, during the last season, there is one competition.
The winner gains promotion to the Montenegrin Basketball League and the runner-up plays with the bottom five teams of the regular season of the First Erste League. The bottom two teams from the play-out group relegate to the Second League.

Current teams

Winners
Below is a list of Montenegrin Second League (Prva B Liga) champions from its inaugural season (2006–07).

See also
 Montenegrin Basketball League
 Montenegrin Basketball Cup

References

External links
Official Website
Montenegrin league on Eurobasket

Basketball leagues in Montenegro
Monte